Hippeastrum miniatum is a flowering perennial herbaceous bulbous plant, in the family Amaryllidaceae, native to Peru.

Description 
Flowers are bright orange-red (vermilion) with up to six flowers per stem. Bulbs ovate, 5–8 cm in length, leaves tongue shaped, 45–63 cm in length, up to 2.5 cm wide, stems 30–45 cm high. Perigonium up to 10 cn in length, 33 cm wide, with stamens of a similar length.

Taxonomy 
First described by Hipólito Ruiz López and José Antonio Pavón Jiménez in 1802, and formerly named by William Herbert in 1821.

Etymology 
miniatum: Latin - the colour vermilion.

Distribution 
H. miniatum grows in river gorges in the high Peruvian Andes.

References

Sources 
 
 GBIF: Hippeastrum miniatum
 
 Brako, L. & J. L. Zarucchi. 1993. Catalogue of the flowering plants and gymnosperms of Peru. Monogr. Syst. Bot. Missouri Bot. Gard. 45.
 Macbride, J. F. et al., eds. 1936–1971. Flora of Peru.; new ser. 1980-
 William Herbert. Amaryllidaceae: Preceded by an Attempt to Arrange the Monocotyledonous Orders, and Followed by a Treatise on Cross-bred Vegetables, and Supplement. Ridgway, London 1837: Hippeastrum miniatum, page 409
 JSTOR Global Plants: Hippeastrum miniatum

Flora of South America
miniatum
Garden plants of South America
Plants described in 1802